The Morge is a small river in eastern France (in the Isère department), a right tributary of the  Isère. Its source is near the Col de Saint-Roch, northeast of Voiron. It flows through Voiron, and joins the Isère south of Voiron, opposite the town of Saint-Quentin-sur-Isère.

References

Rivers of France
Rivers of Auvergne-Rhône-Alpes
Rivers of Isère
Rivers of the Alps